Heckle may refer to:

 Heckle (band), a New Jersey musical group
 Heckle (magpie), an animated character

See also

 AFI / Heckle, a punk rock split EP
 Heckler (disambiguation)
 Heckling (disambiguation)
 Dr. Heckyll and Mr. Jive (disambiguation)